The Battle of Davao (Filipino: Labanan sa Davao; Cebuano: Gubat sa Davao) was a major battle in which American and Philippine Commonwealth troops including locally organized guerrillas fought the Japanese to liberate the city of Davao. The battle is part of Operation VICTOR V, an offensive operation against Japanese forces in Mindanao, and part of the campaign for the liberation of the Philippines during World War II. The battle was the decisive engagement of the Mindanao Campaign.

Background 
Davao was among the first cities in the Philippines to be occupied by Japanese troops in 1942. There were organized guerrilla resistance in Mindanao afterwards, the most prominent one commanded by Wendell W. Fertig, and were largely successful in tying down Japanese units in the island long before the liberation of Philippines began in 1944.

With its navy decisively crushed at the battle of Leyte Gulf six months earlier, the Japanese in Mindanao were now cut off from their main bases in Luzon. The Allies begun their Mindanao assault in 10 March and was spectacularly successful afterwards, despite the problems posed by the island itself, such as its inhospitable terrain, irregular coastline, few roads which complicated supply chains, and the thick defense of the Japanese forces.

Prelude 
The Allies had already taken much of Central Mindanao, having destroyed several Japanese units in Malaybalay and Cabacan sectors beginning 17 April. By this time the Allies are preparing for the assault in Davao City. The strongest of the Japanese defenses in the island were concentrated around the Davao Gulf area, which was heavily mined to counter an amphibious landing, and in Davao City, the island's largest and most important city. Artillery and anti-aircraft batteries extensively ringed the coastal shoreline defenses. Believing that the Americans would ultimately attack from Davao Gulf and also anticipating that they would be eventually driven from the city, the Japanese also prepared defensive bunkers inland behind its perimeter where they could retire and regroup, with the intention of prolonging the campaign as much as possible.

Dispositions and terrain 
Soldiers from the American 8th Army are yet to land from their ships steaming in Davao Gulf heading towards Davao City. With Allied assistance, separate large-sized Philippine guerrilla units were already being formed in eastern and southern Davao Province in anticipation for the upcoming battle.

Defending the city was the role of the Japanese 100th Division under Gen. Harada. With its headquarters at the peak of the Shrine Hills which is west from the city center where it offered strategic vantage point over the Allies as well as commanding view of Davao Gulf where American amphibious units are to disembark, it anchored its defenses at Catigan, thirteen miles southwest from the city center; The Right Sector Unit of five infantry battalions, and in the hills twelve miles north of Davao, The Left Sector Unit of four infantry battalions. The center, overlooking Libby Airdrome, was manned by three battalions. Before the battle began, they already have a vast tunnel network built in the city's hills to counter the Allied assaults and to shield them from air attacks and artillery shelling as well as to necessitate the shifting of troops in the battle; some of them are still in use for the city's tourism purposes.

Battle 
The battle began on 27 April when the first Americans units of Gen. Roscoe B. Woodruff's 24th Division reached what is now Digos, then part of Sta. Cruz town. The division moved westward across Mindanao so rapidly that the Americans and Filipinos were almost on top of the Japanese around Davao before Gen. Morozumi learned too late that the western landing was, in fact, not diversionary. By the time the division reached Digos, the Americans quickly overrun the Japanese defenses who were prepared only to repel an assault from the sea westward, not from their rear to the east. The 24th Division immediately turned north and headed toward Davao City.

Combat inside Davao City
On 3 May 1945, after months of incessant and intense bombardment by American land-based and carrier-based planes and warships, the first combat elements of the 24th Division entered Davao City against less opposition than had been expected. While it took just 15 days, despite severe heat and humidity and constant rain, with an entire division travelling 115 mi (185 km) and seizing the last major Philippine city under Japanese control, the real battle for Mindanao had begun. Up to a point, X Corps had bypassed the main Japanese defenses of the 100th Division, which was inland on higher ground, and where they would now need to be eliminated.

Filipino soldiers of the guerrilla 108th Division cleared the Davao Gulf coast for fifteen miles south of Digos. On 30 April, the 21st Infantry attacked toward Mintal.

A chronicler for the 24th Division wrote:

In this way, fighting progressed slowly, but the Americans and Filipinos were making headway. At Libby Airdrome and the village of Mintal, some 5 mi (8.0 km) west of Davao City, the 21st Infantry Regiment got assailed from three sides in a concentrated attack by a numerically stronger enemy.

Individual acts of heroism often spelled the difference between victory and defeat in the desperate fighting. On 14 May, posthumous Medal of Honor awardee, Pfc. James Diamond of D Company fell mortally wounded as he was leading a patrol to evacuate more casualties when came under heavy attack. He drew enemy fire while sprinting to an abandoned machine gun and was caught in a hail of bullets, but he allowed his patrol to reach safety. The regiment then have to withdraw and regroup with the 24th Division near Toril, at the city's southern part, to prepare for a renewed assault.

On 17 May, after being exhausted and bloodied during the fighting in Mintal village, the 24th Division, with fresh reinforcements, renewed its offensive, with the 21st and 34th Infantry Regiments attacking against the Japanese center, the 34th east of the Talomo river and the 21st west. At the same time, the 19th Infantry Regiment, supported by the guerrilla 107th Division, attacked northwards from the city center. On 28 May, the 34th Infantry contacted the 21st Infantry east of Tugbok, west from the city center.

Naval engagements in Davao Gulf 
American warships sallied in Davao Gulf shortly before the battle began and during the battle after they have landed their troops ashore. While the battle is raging in the city, however, there came another problem from the sea. By the time the battle began, Japanese suicide boats began harassing American shipping in the area, operating from their base at Piso Point, currently part of Banaybanay town which is located at the eastern shore of the gulf.
Piso Point is strategically located at the south with many overhanging trees which allows the Japanese to initiate camouflage attacks against the Allies. As part of the battle the Americans, while engaging in Davao City and its vicinity, were also given the mission to eradicate Japanese troops situated at the western portion of the gulf.

On  May 10, Edgar D. Hoagland, the naval commander of the 24th Division, was given a special task to survey the area for potential Japanese enemies hiding at the areas north of the city including Piso Point. Although he did not witness any suspicious acts at first, he continued to patrol at the north leaving behind his commandeer LCI vessel. The LCI vessel was abruptly attacked by Japanese suicide boats. No one could trace the whereabouts of the Japanese suicide boats since these boats remained under camouflage with the aid of numerous overhanging trees and maze inlets.

The same day an anonymous tip from the provincial guerrillas brought him together with his patrol torpedo boats at Piso Point once more. There, they have discovered that the Japanese have mastered the art of camouflage so well that they hid their suicide boats under mangroves with green, freshly cut palm leaves that enable them to be unseen at a distance greater than 100 yards. Credits are given to Marine Major Richard E. Maulsby, pilot of a Marine Mitchell bomber and Marine First Lieutenant Doit L. Fish for discovering the hidden Japanese suicide boats.

On May 14, Hoagland, together with ensign John Adams, USNR and their patrol torpedo boats, approached the point to exterminate the remaining Japanese troops with their suicide boats. Since they were all suicide boats, all Japanese were killed during the ensuing engagement and no prisoners were taken. Hoagland then ordered his forces to burn their remaining equipment.

Closing the battle 
On 29 May, the 19th Infantry started from the coast north of the city and, with Wendell Fertig's Filipino guerrilla units coming from the west of the city, blew open the Japanese eastern flanks situated west from the city center, capturing the villages of Tacunan, Ula, Matina Biao, Magtuod, and attacking towards Mandug. The fighting later claimed the life of the 19th Infantry's commander, Col. Thomas "Jack" Clifford. The 34th Infantry attacked Harada's second line of defense on 30 May, and the capture of Mandug on 9 June, marked the collapse of the 100th Division. The 21 Infantry took Wangan on the same day. On 10 June, the beaten Japanese 100th Division withdrew into the mountains of Bukidnon.

Devastating American firepower proved crucial during the battle. With the Allied navy controlling Davao Gulf and the Filipinos at the city's surroundings, the rest of Davao City is now encircled at all sides by the Allies. With most of the city including the whole of the city proper now under Allied control, most Japanese units west of the city are now isolated, and Allied troops are now commencing mop-up operations in several sectors in the city and the province. Piecemeal resistance in the west of the city were among the last in the Philippine islands during the liberation campaign before all of them were eventually quelled by the Allies at the end of the war.

Aftermath
The seizure of Davao was as decisive for the 24th Division as the Kabacan road junction capture was for the X Corps. Allied forces continued the liberation campaign in Mindanao, which ended shortly before the war.

After the battle and the war the Japanese, who formed the overwhelming majority in Davao City, stayed for the time being in the city. While some are forcibly expelled back to Japan due to enmity after the war, others were incorporated to the local Filipino population.

Casualties
The fighting around the fringes of Davao City from late April to mid-June, cost the 24th Infantry Division some 350 dead and 1,615 wounded while the Japanese 100th Division suffered about 4,500 killed and 30 captured. Many more from both sides suffered horrendous losses during the vicious fighting elsewhere in the province. By the time it left the city, the Japanese 100th Division is left nearly destroyed from the fighting. The Davao Battle Memorial was built after the war in commemoration and tribute to the belligerents' respective fallen soldiers in the battle.

References 

Military history of the Philippines during World War II
South West Pacific theatre of World War II
1945 in the Philippines
History of Davao City
Battles of World War II involving the United States
April 1945 events in Asia
May 1945 events in Asia
June 1945 events in Asia